This is a list of municipalities in Belgium which have standing links to local communities in other countries known as "town twinning" (usually in Europe) or "sister cities" (usually in the rest of the world).

A
Aalst

 Gabrovo, Bulgaria
 Worcester, South Africa

Aalter

 Creuse, France
 Rotenburg an der Wümme, Germany

Andenne

 Bergheim, Germany
 Chauny, France
 Mottafollone, Italy

Anderlecht

 Boulogne-Billancourt, France
 Hammersmith and Fulham, England, United Kingdom
 Neukölln (Berlin), Germany
 Zaanstad, Netherlands

Anderlues
 Gigondas, France

Anhée
 Quinçay, France

Ans

 Badefols-d'Ans, France
 Chourgnac, France
 Cubjac-Auvézère-Val d'Ans, France
 Granges-d'Ans, France
 Himamaylan, Philippines
 Sainte-Eulalie-d'Ans, France

Antoing

 Crépy-en-Valois, France
 Płońsk, Poland
 Zell am Mosel, Germany

Antwerp

 Barcelona, Spain
 Cape Town, South Africa
 Haifa, Israel
 Ludwigshafen, Germany
 Marseille, France
 Mulhouse, France
 Rostock, Germany

 Saint Petersburg, Russia
 Shanghai, China

Antwerp – Ekeren
 Andernach, Germany

Arlon

 Alba, Italy
 Bitburg, Germany
 Diekirch, Luxembourg
 Market Drayton, England, United Kingdom
 Saint-Dié-des-Vosges, France

Assesse
 Cumières, France

Auderghem
 Patmos, Greece

Aywaille

 Châtillon, France
 Chézy-sur-Marne, France
 Mangalia, Romania
 Markt Nordheim, Germany

B
Bastogne

 Bryan, United States
 College Station, United States
 Périers, France
 Tulette, France

Belœil

 Arco, Italy
 Bogen, Germany
 Crosne, France
 Maybole, Scotland, United Kingdom

 Roccella Ionica, Italy
 Rýmařov, Czech Republic
 Schotten, Germany

Beringen

 Behringen (Bispingen), Germany
 Behringen (Hörselberg-Hainich), Germany
 Behringen (Stadtilm), Germany
 Beringe (Peel en Maas), Netherlands
 Beringen (Mersch), Luxembourg
 Beringen, Switzerland

Beveren
 Wittenberg, Germany

Beyne-Heusay
 Wasquehal, France

Bièvre is a member of the Charter of European Rural Communities, a town twinning association across the European Union, alongside with:

 Bienvenida, Spain
 Bucine, Italy
 Cashel, Ireland
 Cissé, France
 Desborough, England, United Kingdom
 Esch (Haaren), Netherlands
 Hepstedt, Germany
 Ibănești, Romania
 Kandava, Latvia
 Kannus, Finland
 Kolindros, Greece
 Lassee, Austria
 Medzev, Slovakia
 Moravče, Slovenia
 Næstved, Denmark
 Nagycenk, Hungary
 Nadur, Malta
 Ockelbo, Sweden
 Pano Lefkara, Cyprus
 Põlva, Estonia
 Samuel (Soure), Portugal
 Slivo Pole, Bulgaria
 Starý Poddvorov, Czech Republic
 Strzyżów, Poland
 Tisno, Croatia
 Troisvierges, Luxembourg
 Žagarė (Joniškis), Lithuania

Bocholt
 Bocholt, Germany

Bornem

 Bornheim, Germany
 Gordes, France

Boussu

 Anzin, France
 Apt, France
 Hammam Sousse, Tunisia

Braine-le-Comte
 Codroipo, Italy

Braine-l'Alleud

 Basingstoke and Deane, England, United Kingdom
 Drummondville, Canada
 Menden, Germany
 Ouistreham, France
 Šlapanice, Czech Republic

Brasschaat

 Bad Neuenahr-Ahrweiler, Germany
 Tarija, Bolivia

Bree

 Geldern, Germany
 Salomó, Spain
 Volpago del Montello, Italy

Bruges
 Ebolowa, Cameroon

Brussels

 Atlanta, United States
 Beijing, China
 Berlin, Germany
 Kyiv, Ukraine
 Ljubljana, Slovenia
 Prague, Czech Republic
 Washington, D.C., United States

Burdinne
 Rouillon, France

C
Chapelle-lez-Herlaimont

 Boğazlıyan, Turkey
 Bulancak, Turkey
 Calascibetta, Italy
 Châtillon-sur-Indre, France
 Riccia, Italy
 Santa Elisabetta, Italy
 Zagora, Morocco

Charleroi

 Casarano, Italy
 Donetsk, Ukraine
 Follonica, Italy
 Himeji, Japan
 Hirson, France
 Manoppello, Italy

 Saint-Junien, France
 Schramberg, Germany
 Sélestat, France
 Uşak, Turkey
 Waldkirch, Germany

Châtelet

 Casteltermini, Italy
 Vimoutiers, France

Chaudfontaine
 St. Martinville, United States

Chièvres

 Ellon, Scotland, United Kingdom
 Gołuchów, Poland
 Provins, France

Chimay

 Conflans-Sainte-Honorine, France
 Ramsgate, England, United Kingdom

Chiny

 Connaux, France
 Saint-Vérand, France

Comines-Warneton

 Argentonnay, France
 Wolverton, England, United Kingdom

Courcelles

 Abondance, France
 Artogne, Italy
 Guémené-Penfao, France
 Kęty, Poland

D
De Panne

 Bray-Dunes, France
 Hlohovec, Slovakia

Deinze
 Rheinbach, Germany

Denderleeuw
 Rupea, Romania

Dendermonde
 Geldrop-Mierlo, Netherlands

Diest

 Breda, Netherlands
 Dillenburg, Germany
 Orange, France

Diksmuide

 Ellesmere, England, United Kingdom
 Finnentrop, Germany
 Ploemeur, France
 Rottach-Egern, Germany

Dilbeek

 Dalton, United States
 Franschhoek, South Africa
 Obervellach, Austria

Dinant

 Chios, Greece
 Dinan, France

Dison

 Audincourt, France
 Câmpulung, Romania
 Jalapa, Nicaragua

Donceel
 Montecalvo Irpino, Italy

Durbuy

 Hanyū, Japan
 Kościelisko, Poland
 Nieuwpoort, Belgium
 Orimattila, Finland
 Östhammar, Sweden
 Tvrdošín, Slovakia
 Valga, Estonia
 Valka, Latvia

E
Écaussinnes
 Pietrasanta, Italy

Edegem
 San Jerónimo, Peru

Eeklo

 Bagnols-sur-Cèze, France
 Braunfels, Germany
 Carcaixent, Spain
 Feltre, Italy
 Newbury, England, United Kingdom

Esneux

 Châtillon-sur-Seine, France
 Ratzeburg, Germany
 Sława, Poland
 Walcourt, Belgium

Essen

 Essen, Germany
 Hradištko, Czech Republic
 Witzenberg, South Africa
 Žilina, Slovakia

Étalle
 Clérieux, France

Etterbeek

 Fontenay-sous-Bois, France
 Forte dei Marmi, Italy
 Siemiatycze, Poland

Evergem
 Großenkneten, Germany

F
Faimes
 Ambierle, France

Fléron

 Jennings, United States
 Kłodzko, Poland

Fleurus

 Couëron, France
 Wexford, Ireland

Flobecq

 Cairanne, France
 Žďár nad Sázavou, Czech Republic

Floreffe

 Frégimont, France
 Prata di Pordenone, Italy

Frameries

 La Chaux-de-Fonds, Switzerland
 Issy-les-Moulineaux, France
 Tazerka, Tunisia

Frasnes-lez-Anvaing

 Boskovice, Czech Republic
 Monts, France

Froidchapelle
 Vathiménil, France

G
Ganshoren
 Rusatira, Rwanda

Geel

 Monaghan, Ireland
 Tydavnet, Ireland
 Xanten, Germany

Geer
 Aubiet, France

Gembloux

 Aller, Spain
 Épinal, France
 Loughborough, England, United Kingdom
 Skyros, Greece

Genappe

 Littlethorpe, England, United Kingdom
 Narborough, England, United Kingdom

Genk

 Cieszyn, Poland
 Francistown, Botswana
 Nieuwpoort, Belgium
 Troisdorf, Germany

Ghent

 Kanazawa, Japan
 Melle, Germany
 Mohammedia, Morocco
 Nottingham, England, United Kingdom
 Tallinn, Estonia
 Wiesbaden, Germany

Gistel
 Büdingen, Germany

Glabbeek
 Bunești, Romania

Gouvy
 Suze-la-Rousse, France

Grimbergen

 Bayenghem-lès-Éperlecques, France
 Saalfelden am Steinernen Meer, Austria

H
Halen
 Pasewalk, Germany

Halle

 Kadaň, Czech Republic
 Mouvaux, France
 Werl, Germany

Hamoir

 Saulxures-sur-Moselotte, France
 Wenigumstadt (Großostheim), Germany

Hamont-Achel
 Strausberg, Germany

Hannut
 Thouars, France

Harelbeke

 Aire-sur-la-Lys, France
 Eenhana, Namibia
 Frýdek-Místek, Czech Republic
 Kinheim, Germany

Hasselt

 Detmold, Germany
 Itami, Japan
 Mountain View, United States

Heist-op-den-Berg

 Arad, Romania
 Bergrivier, South Africa
 Ercolano, Italy

Herent
 Klenčí pod Čerchovem, Czech Republic

Herentals
 IJsselstein, Netherlands

Herk-de-Stad
 Oborniki, Poland

Herstal

 Castelmauro, Italy

 Kilmarnock, Scotland, United Kingdom
 Mieres, Spain

Heusden-Zolder

 Brilon, Germany
 Hesdin, France

Hoeilaart
 Valtournenche, Italy

Hotton

 Bergholtz, France
 Bourdon, France
 Bunkie, United States
 Idanha-a-Nova, Portugal
 Izegem, Belgium
 Xichang, China

Houffalize is a member of the Douzelage, a town twinning association of towns across the European Union. Houffalize also has two other twin towns.

Douzelage
 Agros, Cyprus
 Altea, Spain
 Asikkala, Finland
 Bad Kötzting, Germany
 Bellagio, Italy
 Bundoran, Ireland
 Chojna, Poland
 Granville, France
 Holstebro, Denmark
 Judenburg, Austria
 Kőszeg, Hungary
 Marsaskala, Malta
 Meerssen, Netherlands
 Niederanven, Luxembourg
 Oxelösund, Sweden
 Preveza, Greece
 Rokiškis, Lithuania
 Rovinj, Croatia
 Sesimbra, Portugal
 Sherborne, England, United Kingdom
 Sigulda, Latvia
 Siret, Romania
 Škofja Loka, Slovenia
 Sušice, Czech Republic
 Tryavna, Bulgaria
 Türi, Estonia
 Zvolen, Slovakia
Other
 Hillesheim, Germany
 Saint-Pair-sur-Mer, France

Houyet
 Rasteau, France

Huy

 Arona, Italy
 Compiègne, France
 Natitingou, Benin
 Tienen, Belgium
 Vélingara, Senegal
 Vianden, Luxembourg

I
Ittre
 Écueillé, France

Ixelles

 Biarritz, France
 Kalamu, Democratic Republic of the Congo
 Megiddo, Israel
 Zababdeh, Palestine

Izegem

 Bad Zwischenahn, Germany
 Bailleul, France
 Hilders, Germany
 Hotton, Belgium
 Zlín, Czech Republic

J
Jalhay
 Nolay, France

Jemeppe-sur-Sambre
 Bagira, Democratic Republic of the Congo

K
Kalmthout
 Štěchovice, Czech Republic

Kasterlee

 Fountain Hills, United States
 Murgești (Acățari), Romania
 Plaffeien, Switzerland

Kluisbergen
 Guînes, France

Koekelberg

 Hyères, France
 Kołobrzeg, Poland
 Sanlúcar de Barrameda, Spain

Koksijde

 Bad Schallerbach, Austria
 Biedenkopf, Germany
 La Charité-sur-Loire, France
 Konz, Germany
 Marowijne, Suriname
 Neustadt an der Orla, Germany

Kortenberg
 Parcé, France

Kortrijk

 Bad Godesberg (Bonn), Germany
 Greenville, United States
 Frascati, Italy
 Saint-Cloud, France
 Windsor and Maidenhead, England, United Kingdom

Kraainem

 Cyanika, Rwanda
 Saint-Trojan-les-Bains, France

Kuurne

 Chiuza, Romania
 Kuressaare (Saaremaa), Estonia
 Marcq-en-Barœul, France

L
Laakdal

 Jurbarkas, Lithuania
 Tönisvorst, Germany

Laarne

 Fényeslitke, Hungary
 Gagnières, France

Lens
 Saint-Donat-sur-l'Herbasse, France

Leuven

 Cristian, Romania
 's-Hertogenbosch, Netherlands
 Kraków, Poland
 Lüdenscheid, Germany
 Rennes, France

Leuze-en-Hainaut

 Carencro, United States
 Loudun, France
 Ouagadougou, Burkina Faso
 Saint-André-et-Appelles, France
 Sainte-Opportune-la-Mare, France

Lichtervelde
 Région d'Audruicq, France

Liedekerke
 Steinfurt, Germany

Liège

 Cologne, Germany
 Elbasan, Albania
 Esch-sur-Alzette, Luxembourg
 Fuzhou, China
 Lille, France
 Lubumbashi, Democratic Republic of the Congo
 Nancy, France
 Plzeň, Czech Republic
 Porto, Portugal
 Ramallah, Palestine
 Rotterdam, Netherlands
 Saint-Louis, Senegal
 Samarkand, Uzbekistan
 Szeged, Hungary
 Tangier, Morocco
 Turin, Italy
 Volgograd, Russia

Linkebeek

 Kenton, England, United Kingdom
 Val-du-Layon, France

Lint
 Lith (Oss), Netherlands

Lommel
 Ciudad Darío, Nicaragua

Londerzeel
 Gladenbach, Germany

La Louvière

 Aragona, Italy
 Bojnice, Slovakia
 Foligno, Italy
 Giresun, Turkey
 Kalisz, Poland
 Saint-Maur-des-Fossés, France

Lubbeek

 Lalín, Spain
 Lalinde, France
 Linden, Germany
 Linden (Cuijk), Netherlands
 Sankt Georgen am Walde, Austria

M
Maarkedal
 Horšovský Týn, Czech Republic

Maasmechelen

 Škofja Loka, Slovenia
 Triandria, Greece

Maldegem

 Adria, Italy
 Ermont, France
 Lampertheim, Germany
 Świdnica (rural gmina), Poland

Malle

 Hartley Wintney, England, United Kingdom
 Heusenstamm, Germany
 Saint-Savin, France
 Zakrzówek, Poland

Malmedy
 Beaune, France

Manage

 Bevagna, Italy
 Landrecies, France
 Saint-Laurent-Médoc, France

Mechelen

 Chengdu, China
 Helmond, Netherlands

Melle

 Melle, France
 Melle, Germany

Meix-devant-Virton
 Guérigny, France

Menen
 Halluin, France

Merksplas

 Delligsen, Germany
 Hatfield, England, United Kingdom
 Grodzisk Wielkopolski, Poland

Mettet
 Fonyód, Hungary

Middelkerke

 Büchenbeuren, Germany
 Clevedon, England, United Kingdom
 Épernay, France
 Ettlingen, Germany
 Rauschenberg, Germany
 Sohren, Germany

Mol

 Karakara, Niger
 Santo Tomás, Nicaragua

Molenbeek-Saint-Jean

 M'Bour, Senegal
 Oujda, Morocco

Momignies

 Anor, France
 Gizałki, Poland
 Monts-sur-Guesnes, France

Mons

 Briare, France
 Changsha, China
 Little Rock, United States
 Sefton, England, United Kingdom
 Thoissey, France
 Vannes, France

Montigny-le-Tilleul

 Cousolre, France
 Montereale Valcellina, Italy
 Vincennes, France

Mont-Saint-Guibert
 Cogny, France

Morlanwelz

 Blaj, Romania
 Pleszew, Poland
 Le Quesnoy, France
 Villarosa, Italy

Mouscron

 Beuvry-la-Forêt, France
 Bonnemain, France
 Fécamp, France
 Fontaine-sur-Somme, France
 Rheinfelden, Germany
 Vale of Glamorgan, Wales, United Kingdom

N
Namur

 Bandung, Indonesia
 Bourg-en-Bresse, France
 Cluj-Napoca, Romania
 Huế, Vietnam
 Lafayette, United States
 Pristina, Kosovo
 Qixia (Nanjing), China
 Quebec City, Canada

Nandrin

 Saint-Père-Marc-en-Poulet, France
 Saint-Séverin, France

Nieuwerkerken
 San Casciano in Val di Pesa, Italy

Nieuwpoort

 Durbuy, Belgium
 Genk, Belgium
 Nieuwpoort (Molenwaard), Netherlands
 Rodgau, Germany

Nijlen

 Cotnari, Romania
 Güssing, Austria

Ninove
 Deszk, Hungary

Nivelles

 Saintes, France
 Saint-Just-en-Chaussée, France

O
Olen
 Białogard, Poland

Olne

 Candé-sur-Beuvron, France
 Les Montils, France

Oosterzele
 Oberkirch, Germany

Oostkamp

 Bad Langensalza, Germany
 Bad Nauheim, Germany
 Chaumont, France

Ostend
 Banjul, Gambia

Ottignies-Louvain-la-Neuve

 Jassans-Riottier, France
 Tiassalé, Ivory Coast
 Veszprém, Hungary

Oudenaarde

 Arras, France
 Bergen op Zoom, Netherlands
 Buzău, Romania
 Castel Madama, Italy
 Coburg, Germany
 Hastings, England, United Kingdom

Oupeye
 Erquy, France

Overijse

 Bacharach, Germany
 Bruttig-Fankel, Germany
 Lecco, Italy
 Mâcon, France
 Modra, Slovakia

P
Pecq
 Manéglise, France

Péruwelz

 Jaunay-Marigny, France
 Paray-Vieille-Poste, France

Perwez

 Kaysersberg Vignoble, France
 Orbais-l'Abbaye, France

Pittem

 La Meyze, France
 Shawnee, United States

Poperinge

 Hythe, England, United Kingdom
 Rixensart, Belgium
 Wolnzach, Germany
 Žatec, Czech Republic

Puurs-Sint-Amands
 Dębica, Poland

Q
Quaregnon

 Assoro, Italy
 Aÿ-Champagne, France
 Condé-sur-l'Escaut, France

R
Ramillies
 Plourhan, France

Rebecq
 Monghidoro, Italy

Rixensart

 Birstall, England, United Kingdom
 Bradu, Romania
 Poperinge, Belgium
 Ruhondo, Rwanda
 Le Touquet, France
 Winterberg, Germany

Rochefort

 Estaires, France
 Morges, Switzerland

Roeselare
 Dogbo-Tota, Benin

Ronse

 Jablonec nad Nisou, Czech Republic
 Kleve, Germany
 M'saken, Tunisia
 Saint-Valery-sur-Somme, France
 Sandwich, England, United Kingdom

Rotselaar
 Bad Gandersheim, Germany

Ruiselede
 Kraśnik, Poland

S
Saint-Ghislain

 Saint-Lô, France
 Sierakowice, Poland

Saint-Gilles

 Berkane, Morocco
 Likasi, Democratic Republic of the Congo
 Offenbach am Main, Germany

Saint-Josse-ten-Noode

 Eskişehir, Turkey
 Tangier, Morocco
 Verona, Italy

Sambreville

 Gessopalena, Italy
 Nuits-Saint-Georges, France
 Pont-Sainte-Maxence, France
 San Pietro al Natisone, Italy

Sankt Vith

 Kerpen, Germany
 Teiuș, Romania

Schaerbeek
 Beyoğlu, Turkey

Schoten
 Tarnów, Poland

Seraing

 Châtel, France
 Douai, France
 Rimini, Italy

Silly

 San Miniato, Italy
 Saline, France

Sint-Genesius-Rode
 Nordmaling, Sweden

Sint-Gillis-Waas
 Águeda, Portugal

Sint-Katelijne-Waver
 Iernut, Romania

Sint-Niklaas

 Abingdon-on-Thames, England, United Kingdom
 Colmar, France
 Gorinchem, Netherlands
 Al Hoceima, Morocco
 Lucca, Italy
 Schongau, Germany
 Tambacounda, Senegal

Sint-Pieters-Leeuw
 Altenahr, Germany

Sint-Truiden

 Duras, France
 Nueva Guinea, Nicaragua

Soignies
 Hazebrouck, France

Spa

 Cabourg, France
 Eguisheim, France
 La Garde, France

Stavelot

 Pommard, France
 Solignac, France

T
Theux

 Bierstadt (Wiesbaden), Germany
 Terrasson-Lavilledieu, France

Tielt

 Brignoles, France
 Bruneck, Italy
 Groß-Gerau, Germany
 Szamotuły, Poland

Tienen

 Hergiswil, Switzerland
 Huy, Belgium
 Valkenswaard, Netherlands

Tinlot

 Diarville, France
 Tantonville, France

Tournai

 Bethlehem, Palestine
 Mogi das Cruzes, Brazil
 Shumen, Bulgaria
 Tarija, Bolivia
 Troyes, France
 Villeneuve-d'Ascq, France

Tubize

 Korntal-Münchingen, Germany
 Mirande, France
 Scandiano, Italy

Turnhout

 Hammelburg, Germany
 Hanzhong, China
 Gödöllő, Hungary
 Vânători (Mișca), Romania

U
Uccle
 Neuilly-sur-Seine, France

V
Vaux-sur-Sûre

 Crowley, United States
 Vaux, France

Verviers

 Arles, France
 Bradford, England, United Kingdom
 Mönchengladbach, Germany
 La Motte-Chalancon, France
 Roubaix, France

Veurne
 Rösrath, Germany

Vielsalm

 Bruyères, France
 Zonnebeke, Belgium

Vilvoorde

 Ennepetal, Germany
 Komatsu, Japan
 Maubeuge, France
 Middelburg, Netherlands
 Peñarroya-Pueblonuevo, Spain

Visé
 Honfleur, France

W
Waasmunster

 Braloștița, Romania
 Kranjska Gora, Slovenia

Walcourt

 Châtillon-sur-Seine, France
 Esneux, Belgium
 Ratzeburg, Germany

Waregem
 Szekszárd, Hungary

Waremme

 Gallinaro, Italy
 Gérardmer, France
 Skopje, North Macedonia

Waterloo

 Nagakute, Japan
 Rambouillet, France

Watermael-Boitsfort

 Annan, Scotland, United Kingdom
 Chantilly, France
 Hegyvidék (Budapest), Hungary

Westerlo

 Oirschot, Netherlands
 Ottersweier, Germany
 Westerlo, United States

Wetteren
 Brakel, Germany

Woluwe-Saint-Lambert
 Meudon, France

Woluwe-Saint-Pierre

 Chaoyang (Beijing), China
 Gangnam (Seoul), South Korea
 Goma, Democratic Republic of the Congo
 New Iberia, United States
 Pecica, Romania
 Ruyumba, Rwanda

Y
Ypres

 Lehrte, Germany
 Saint-Omer, France
 Seelbach, Germany
 Siegen, Germany

Yvoir

 Boulazac-Isle-Manoire, France
 Finspång, Sweden
 Givet, France
 Stromberg, Germany
 Vitteaux, France

Z
Zandhoven
 Alheim, Germany

Zaventem
 Blankenheim, Germany

Zedelgem
 Reil, Germany

Zele
 Cham, Germany

Zelzate

 Aubenas, France
 Cesenatico, Italy
 Schwarzenbek, Germany
 Sierre, Switzerland

Zemst

 Sokone, Senegal
 Spermezeu, Romania

Zoersel

 Crucea, Romania
 Laubach, Germany
 Lora del Río, Spain

Zonhoven
 Gayndah (North Burnett), Australia

Zonnebeke

 Éperlecques, France

 Marrickville (Inner West), Australia
 Vielsalm, Belgium
 Waimakariri, New Zealand
 Wicko, Poland

Zottegem
 Mödling, Austria

Zulte
 Halluin, France

Zwalm
 Schwalmstadt, Germany

Zwevegem

 Le Coteau, France
 Lorsch, Germany

Zwijndrecht
 Idstein, Germany

References

Belgium
Belgium geography-related lists
Foreign relations of Belgium
Cities in Belgium
Populated places in Belgium